In season 2012–13 Red Star Belgrade will be competing in Serbian SuperLiga, Serbian Cup and UEFA Europa League.

Previous season positions
The club competed in Serbian SuperLiga, Serbian Cup in domestic and UEFA Europa League in European competitions. Finishing 2nd in domestic league, behind Partizan, won Serbian Cup (beat Borac Čačak in final) and losing to 6th placed team from French championship Rennais in Play-off round for UEFA Europa League.

Kit
Red Star Belgrade players are wearing a kit made by Legea for the 2012–13 season. The home colors are of a typical Red-White design with small stripes. The Away and third kit colors are swapped. Also both away and third kit are based on Udinese Calcio Away kits.

Players

Squad statistics

1 These players also hold Serbian citizenship.

Top scorers
Includes all competitive matches. The list is sorted by shirt number when total goals are equal.

Updated 17 March 2013

Player transfer

In 

Total Expenditure:  452.17K €

Out 

Total Income:  940K €

Competitions

Serbian SuperLiga

Red Star Belgrade will compete with 15 other teams in the Serbian SuperLiga.

League table

Results and positions by round

Matches

Serbian Cup

Red Star Belgrade will participate in the 7th Serbian Cup starting in the Round of 32.

First round

Last 16

Quarter-final

UEFA Europa League

By winning 2011–12 Serbian Cup, Red Star Belgrade qualified for the Europa League. They started in the second qualifying round against Belarus side Naftan Novopolotsk, and were eliminated in Play-off round by French side Bordeaux.

Second qualifying round

Third qualifying round

Play-off round

References

External links
 Official Website
 UEFA

2012-13
Red Star Belgrade season